Rías Baixas is a Spanish Denominación de Origen (DO) (Denominación de Orixe in Galician) for wines located in the province of Pontevedra and the south of the province of Corunna in the autonomous community of Galicia, Spain. It is renowned for its white wines made from the Albariño grape variety. Its headquarters is located in the city of Pontevedra.

History
It is believed that the Albariño grape was introduced to the area in the 12th century by the Cistercian monks of the Monastery of Armenteira.

The sub-zones of Rosal and Condado have a long history of grape growing and wine production and have their own traditional styles. The Salnés sub-zone only recently began to produce Albariño wines, for local sales to bars and restaurants.

Rías Baixas acquired its official status as a Denominación de Origen (DO) in 1988. This replaced the earlier "Denominación Específica Albariño" status which had been granted in 1980. Its Consejo Regulador is based in the city of Pontevedra.

Geography
The DO is divided into five sub-zones, four of them in the province of Pontevedra and one in the south of the province of A Coruña.

Val do Salnés
Val do Salnés is located on the lower reaches of the river Umia and centred on the town of Cambados. The landscape is of low undulating hills and the vineyards are planted both on the slopes and on the flat valley floors. The soil is generally rocky and alluvial.

O Rosal
O Rosal is located further south, along the Portuguese frontier in the basin of the river Miño and extends from the Atlantic coast inwards towards the town of Tui. The vineyards here are planted on terraces on the banks of the Miño. The soils are alluvial.

Condado do Tea
Condado do Tea, in the west, extends eastwards from Tui along the Miño valley up to the neighbouring Ribeiro (DO). The landscape is more abrupt and consists of several small river valleys. The soils are granite and slate based.

Soutomaior
The Soutomaior sub-zone was incorporated into the Denominación de Origen in 1996 and is located just south of the city of Pontevedra. The soils are light and sandy, and covered with granite.

Ribera de Ulla
The Ribera de Ulla sub-zone, to the north of Pontevedra was incorporated recently in 2000. The soils are mainly alluvial.

Climate
The climate is Atlantic, with wet winters and sea fog. In general rainfall is high and the temperatures mild. In general, maximum temperatures in summer rarely usually exceed 30 °C and only drop to 0 °C in December and January.

The coldest areas are Ribera do Ulla and  Val do Salnés due to their proximity to the coast. The warmest is Condado do Tea where temperatures in summer sometimes approach 40 °C, but the winters are cold with frequent frosts and rainfall of over 2,000 mm a year.

Strong winds can occasionally cause problems for the vineyards, especially those located on the west face of the coast. Frosts, hailstones and summer heat can also cause complications.

Grapes
The regulatory Council (Consejo Regulador) of the Rias Baixas DO currently authorises twelve different grape varieties, though Albariño represents over 90% of all vines planted.
Authorised white grapes: Albariño, Loureira blanca, Treixadura, Caiño blanca, Torrontés and Godello
Authorised red varieties: Caiño tinto, Espadeiro, Loureira Tinta, Sousón, Mencía and Brancellao

The vines are trained along granite posts (called parrales) and wires so as to protect them from humidity and to maximise their exposure to the sun in summer.

Over 90% of the wines produced are white, predominantly using the Albariño grape variety.

See also
Galician wine

References

External links
 Official website of DO Rias Baixas

Wine regions of Spain
Galicia (Spain)